Jeremiah Meyer  (born Jeremias Majer; 18 January 1735 – 20 January 1789) was an 18th-century English miniature painter. He was Painter in Miniatures to Queen Charlotte, Painter in Enamels to King George III and was one of the founder members of the Royal Academy.

Early life and education
Meyer was born in Tübingen as a son of the German painter Wolfgang Dietrich Majer. In about 1750 he was brought to England by his father, though sources disagree on date and age.
In 1757–8, Meyer studied enamel painting with Christian Friedrich Zincke, paying £400 for tuition and materials. His style was influenced by attention to detail of the work of Joshua Reynolds.

Career
Meyer's background as an enamel painter contrasted with the training of contemporary English miniaturists such as Samuel Finney and Gervase Spencer. These initially worked in watercolour on ivory and only turned later to enamels as the popularity of enamelists like Zincke's work grew.

He may have spent time at Hogarth's St Martin's Lane Academy.
In 1760 and 1764 Meyer exhibited enamels with the Society of Arts.
In 1761 he was awarded a gold medal prize of £20 by the Society of Artists for a portrait of the king in profile, drawn from memory, engravings from this by James MacArdell and others were very popular. In the same year the king gave Charlotte a miniature of himself by Meyer, set in an oval of diamonds within a pearl bracelet, as an engagement present. 
In 1764 he was appointed miniature painter to Queen Charlotte, and painter in enamel to George III.

In 1765 Meyer became one of the original directors of the Incorporated Society of Artists, and in 1768 was chosen a foundation member of the Royal Academy. He contributed to the Academy's exhibitions until 1783, sending several portraits of members of the Royal Family. The establishment of the Royal Academy pension fund in 1775 was due to Meyer's initiative. He was a friend of both George Romney and William Hayley, and brought them together in 1776.
Several details of Meyer's life come from Hayley's biography of Romney.

His name has often been associated with head of the king used on coinage. It is not certain that his work was used on coins minted in Britain, but his profile of George III was used on a pistole of 1767 for the Electorate of Brunswick-Lüneburg.

Personal life
Meyer was naturalised in 1762. In 1763 he married Barbara Marsden, an artist from childhood, and lived for many years at Tavistock Row, Covent Garden. They had two or possibly three sons and four daughters. One of his sons, George Charles Meyer, worked as a civil servant in Calcutta apparently on the recommendation of Joshua Reynolds who described him as "the son of a particular friend of mine".

He retired to Kew, living with his family in a house on the north side of Kew Green for many years simply known as 'Meyer's House'. The adjacent road leading from Kew Green to the River Thames, now 'Ferry Lane', was known as 'Meyer's Alley' for over a century after Meyer's death. The house is now known as 'Hanover House'. It was Grade II listed in 1950 and forms part of the Herbarium of Kew Gardens.

Joshua Meyer died at Kew on 20 January 1789 and is buried in the churchyard of St Anne's Church, Kew, close to Gainsborough. A mural tablet to his memory, with a medallion portrait and some eulogistic verses by Hayley, is inside the north aisle of the church. He was survived by at least two daughters and another son, William, and his widow, who remained at the house until her death on 18 April 1818.

References

External links
 
 
 Profile on Royal Academy of Arts Collections
 Works by Jeremiah Meyer at the Victoria & Albert Museum

1735 births
1789 deaths
18th-century English painters
English male painters
Portrait miniaturists
English enamellers
German enamellers
18th-century enamellers
Burials at St. Anne's Church, Kew
People from Tübingen
Royal Academicians
18th-century English male artists